Abu Zora Tarif (fl. about 700) was an Umayyad general. He is best known for his participation in the Umayyad conquest of Hispania from July 710-712 AD and was near Algeciras.

References

8th-century Arabs